The 2020–21 FA Trophy (known for sponsorship reasons as the Buildbase FA Trophy) was the 52nd season of the FA Trophy, an annual football competition for teams at levels 5-8 of the English National League System.  In a change in format from previous years, the competition consisted of three qualifying rounds, and seven proper rounds.  Teams from level 8 entered into the first and second qualifying rounds, level 7 into the third qualifying round, level 6  (the National League North and National League South) into round 2, and level 5 (the National League) into round 3.

All matches were in a single-match knockout format, with the winner decided by penalties if the match was drawn after 90 minutes, apart from the Final where the winner was decided by extra-time and penalties if the match was drawn. This was a change from previous seasons where replays were used and where the semi-finals were scheduled as two-legged; the changes reflected the late start of the season due to the COVID-19 pandemic in the United Kingdom. The final was a single-match held at Wembley Stadium.

Calendar
The calendar for the 2020-21 Buildbase FA Trophy, as announced by The Football Association.

First Round Qualifying

The draw was made on 18 August 2020. All results taken from The Football Association website.

Second Round Qualifying

The draw was made on 18 August 2020.

Third Round Qualifying

The draw was made on 19 October 2020. Due to the withdrawal of Merthyr Town from the competition, there was an odd number of teams competing in this round. As a result, Willand Rovers were drawn to receive a bye to the First Round Proper.

First round proper

The draw was made on 2 November 2020. Originally scheduled for 14 November 2020, the First Round Proper ties were postponed due to the COVID-19 pandemic.

Second round proper

The draw was made on 9 December 2020.

Third round proper
The draw was made on 9 December with ties scheduled to be played on 19 December. Stamford were awarded a bye due to the withdrawal of Macclesfield Town.

Fourth round proper
The draw was made on 21 December, with ties initially scheduled to be played on 16 January.

Fifth Round Proper
The draw was made on 18 January, with ties initially scheduled to be played on 6 February.

Quarter-finals
The draw was made on 8 February 2021, with ties scheduled to be played on 27 February.

Semi-finals
The draw was made on 1 March 2021, with ties scheduled to be played on 27 March.

Final

The final was held on Saturday 22 May 2021.

References

External links

FA Trophy seasons
FA Trophy